Phil O'Brien (31 December 1930 – 13 August 2020) was an Australian rules footballer who played with Hawthorn in the Victorian Football League (VFL).

Honours and achievements 
Individual
 Hawthorn life member

Notes

External links 

2020 deaths
1930 births
Australian rules footballers from Victoria (Australia)
Hawthorn Football Club players